The 2011 Open GDF Suez Région Limousin was a professional tennis tournament played on hard courts. It was the 6th edition of the tournament which was part of the 2011 ITF Women's Circuit. It took place in Limoges, France between 17 and 23 October 2011.

WTA entrants

Seeds

 1 Rankings are as of October 10, 2011.

Other entrants
The following players received wildcards into the singles main draw:
  Lou Brouleau
  Céline Cattaneo
  Irena Pavlovic
  Constance Sibille

The following players received entry from the qualifying draw:
  Clothilde de Bernardi
  Svitalana Pirazhenka
  Irina Ramialison
  Patrycja Sanduska

Champions

Singles

 Sorana Cîrstea def.  Sofia Arvidsson, 6–2, 6–2

Doubles

 Sofia Arvidsson /  Jill Craybas def.  Caroline Garcia /  Aurélie Védy, 6–4, 4–6, [10–7]

External links
Official Website
ITF Search 

Open GDF Suez Region Limousin
2011 in French tennis
Open de Limoges